Mannan Hira (1956 – 23 December 2020) was a Bangladeshi dramatist and filmmaker. He was the recipient of 2006 Bangla Academy Literary Award in the drama category.

Career
Hira was a member of Aranyak Natyadal and involved in street theatre movement. He was the president of Bangladesh Path Natok Parishad. He had written around 15 theater plays including Laal Jamin, Bhager Manush, Moyur Singhasan and Sada-Kalo. Murkha Loker Murkha Kotha is one of his street plays.
In 2014, Hira debuted as a filmmaker through Ekatturer Khudiram, a children's film set during the Bangladesh Liberation War.

Works
 Laal Jamin
 Bhager Manush
 Moyur Singhasan and Sada-Kalo
 Murkha Loker Murkha Kotha
 Ekatturer Khudiram

References

External links
 

1956 births
2020 deaths
People from Sirajganj District
Rajshahi College alumni
University of Dhaka alumni
Bangladeshi dramatists and playwrights
Bangladeshi film directors
Recipients of Bangla Academy Award
Date of birth missing